Lance Ward (born June 2, 1978) is a Canadian former professional ice hockey defenceman. He holds the current Elitserien record for most penalty minutes during one season.

Playing career
Born in Lloydminster, Alberta, Ward was originally drafted 10th overall by the New Jersey Devils in the 1996 NHL Entry Draft, but he re-entered the draft and was selected 63rd overall by the Florida Panthers in the 1998 NHL Entry Draft. Ward has played 209 career NHL games, scoring 4 goals and 12 assists for 16 points, and 391 penalty minutes. During the 2004–05 NHL lockout Ward did not play.

Ward signed a one-year contract on June 5, 2006, with the Swedish Elitserien club HV71 from Jönköping. On February 20, 2007, in a game against Färjestads BK, Ward broke both HV71's club record and the Elitserien record for most penalty minutes in one season when he checked one player into the boards and seconds later speared another in front of the crease. The sequence ended with Ward being penalized with 7 minutes plus game misconduct (adding another 20 minutes).

During the off-season 2007–08, Ward turned down a contract extension from HV71 to instead sign a two-year deal with the Austrian club Graz 99ers. In June, 2007, Graz revoked the contract and stated they will not pay Ward the amount settled in the signing. Ward returned to Sweden and re-signed with HV71 for another year.

After winning the Elitserien playoff finals with HV71 in 2008, Ward signed with the German DEL team Frankfurt Lions. After one season with Frankfurt, he signed a two-year contract to return to HV71 in 2009.

Post career
Lance Ward was hired on as a full-time staff member within the Lloydminster public school hockey division in 2015. With Ward's new position, he has also been named the director of its hockey academy.

Awards
 Swedish Champion with HV71 in 2008.
 Swedish Champion with HV71 in 2010.

Records
 Elitserien record for penalty minutes (273) 2007
 Elitserien record for penalty minutes (212) 2008

Career statistics

References

External links

1978 births
Living people
Beast of New Haven players
Binghamton Senators players
Canadian ice hockey defencemen
Cincinnati Mighty Ducks players
Florida Panthers draft picks
Florida Panthers players
Frankfurt Lions players
HV71 players
Sportspeople from Lloydminster
Louisville Panthers players
Mighty Ducks of Anaheim players
National Hockey League first-round draft picks
New Jersey Devils draft picks
Red Deer Rebels players
Ice hockey people from Alberta
Canadian expatriate ice hockey players in Germany
Canadian expatriate ice hockey players in Sweden